Grapeland High School is a public high school located in the city of Grapeland, Texas and classified as a 2A school by the UIL.  It is a part of the Grapeland Independent School District located in north central Houston County.   In 2015, the school was rated "Met Standard" by the Texas Education Agency.

Athletics
The Grapeland Sandies compete in these sports - 

Volleyball, Cross Country, Football, Basketball, Powerlifting, Golf, Tennis, Track, Baseball & Softball

State titles
Boys Golf
2017(2A)
Boys Basketball - 
1985(2A)
Girls Basketball - 
1989(2A)
Football - 
1974(1A)

State Finalist
Girls Basketball - 
1988(2A)

Theater
One Act Play 
1962(1A), 1968(1A)

Notable alumni
 Tony Jones (class of 1983) professional football player for the Houston Oilers, Atlanta Falcons & Arizona Cardinals 1990-1993

References

External links
Grapeland ISD website

Public high schools in Texas
Schools in Houston County, Texas